In enzymology, an indole-3-acetaldehyde reductase (NADH) is an enzyme that catalyzes the chemical reaction

(indol-3-yl)ethanol + NAD+  (indol-3-yl)acetaldehyde + NADH + H+

Thus, the two substrates of this enzyme are (indol-3-yl)ethanol and NAD+, whereas its 3 products are (indol-3-yl)acetaldehyde, NADH, and H+.

This enzyme belongs to the family of oxidoreductases, specifically those acting on the CH-OH group of donor with NAD+ or NADP+ as acceptor. The systematic name of this enzyme class is (indol-3-yl)ethanol:NAD+ oxidoreductase. Other names in common use include indoleacetaldehyde reductase, indole-3-acetaldehyde reductase (NADH), and indole-3-ethanol:NAD+ oxidoreductase. This enzyme participates in tryptophan metabolism.

References

 

EC 1.1.1
NADH-dependent enzymes
Enzymes of unknown structure